Bauhinia monandra is a species of leguminous trees, of the family Fabaceae. Common names include pink bauhinia, orchid tree, and Napoleon's plume. The tree is native to Madagascar, where it is widespread in lowland humid forests and dry forests. It has naturalised in Myanmar, Australia, Christmas Island, the Caribbean, southern USA, Colombia, Brazil, and the Pacific Islands. The species is invasive in New Caledonia.

References

External links

monandra
Flora of Myanmar
Flora of Madagascar
Flora of Christmas Island
Flora of the Caribbean
Flora of the Southern United States
Flora of the Pacific
Flora of the Madagascar dry deciduous forests
Flora of the Madagascar lowland forests
Flora without expected TNC conservation status